Records for the Manly-Warringah Sea Eagles club have been recorded since their first season in the New South Wales Rugby Football League premiership in 1947.

Premierships and Titles
{| class="wikitable" width="75%" style="font-size:90%"
|- bgcolor="#efefef"
! colspan=11 |Manly Warringah Sea Eagles
|-
|As of 2 September 2022
|-
|Premiership Titles  1972, 1973, 1976, 1978, 1987, 1996, 2008, 2011 (8)
|-
|Premiership Runners-Up  1951, 1957, 1959, 1968, 1970, 1982, 1983, 1995, 1997, 2007, 2013 (11)
|-
|Minor Premiership Titles  1971, 1972, 1973, 1976, 1983, 1987, 1995, 1996, 1997 (9)
|- 
|Pre-Season Cup  1980
|-
|Sevens Tournaments  1990, 1994, 1995 (3)
|-
|NRL Nines Tournaments  Nil
|-
|Reserve Grade Titles  1954, 1960, 1969, 1973, 1988 (5)
|-
|Jersey Flegg Cup Titles  1961, 1974, 1987 (3)
|-
|Third Grade Titles  1952 (1)
|-
|Presidents Cup  1946, 1970 (2)
|-
|National Youth Competition Titles  2017 (1)
|-
|KB Cup  1982, 1983 (2)
|-
|S.G. Ball Cup  Nil
|-
|Harold Matthews Cup  2021 (1)
|-
|Club Championships  1972, 1983, 1987, 1988 (4)
|-
|First Grade Wooden Spoons  Nil
|-
|National Youth Competition Wooden Spoons  2011, 2013, 2016
|-
|World Club Challenge  2009
|}

Player Records
Players in Bold represent still active (as of 2023)

Most games for club
309, Cliff Lyons (1986–1999)	
285, Daly Cherry-Evans (2011–)
280, Steve Menzies (1993–1999, 2003–2008)
278, Anthony Watmough (2003–2014)
263, Alan Thompson (1973–1984)
256, Des Hasler (1984–1993, 1995–1996)
241, Fred Jones (1961–1963, 1965–1975)
238, Geoff Toovey (1988–1999)
237, Graham Eadie (1971–1983)
233, Brett Stewart (2003–2016)
230, Steve Matai (2005–2016)

Most points for club
1,917 (71 tries, 847 goals, 3 field goals), Graham Eadie (1971–1983)
1,410 (86 tries, 533 goals), Jamie Lyon (2007–2016)
1,154 (40 tries, 501 goals, 18 field goals), Bob Batty (1959–1971)
1,093 (32 tries, 477 goals, 11 field goals), Matthew Ridge (1990–1996)
958 (20 tries, 447 goals, 2 field goals), Ron Willey (1956–1962)
842 (46 tries, 352 goals), Ron Rowles (1950–1954)
816, (57 tries, 294 goals), Reuben Garrick (2019–)

Most tries for club
163, Brett Stewart (2003–2016)
151, Steve Menzies (1993–1999, 2003–2008)
129, Bob Fulton (1966–1976)
91, Steve Matai (2005–2016)
88, Jorge Taufua (2012–2022)
86, Jamie Lyon (2007–2016)
83, Tom Mooney (1975–1981)
81, Tom Trbojevic (2015–)
80, Cliff Lyons (1986–1999)	
79, Daly Cherry-Evans (2011–)
72, Des Hasler (1984–1993, 1995–1996)

Most goals for club
847, Graham Eadie (1971–1983)
533, Jamie Lyon (2007–2016)
501, Bob Batty (1959–1971)
477, Matthew Ridge (1990–1996)
449, Ron Willey (1956–1962)
352, Ron Rowles (1950–1954)

Most field goals for club
57, Bob Fulton (1966–1976)
30, Dennis Ward (1968–1972)
26, Daly Cherry-Evans (2011–)
18, Bob Batty, (1959–1971)
11, Matthew Ridge (1990–1996)

Most points in a season
334 (23 tries, 121 goals), Reuben Garrick in 2021
257 (11 tries, 106 goals, 1 field goal), Matthew Ridge in 1995
242 (14 tries, 100 goals), Graham Eadie in 1975
242 (16 tries, 89 goals), Jamie Lyon in 2013
234 (5 tries, 106 goals, 2 field goals), Matthew Ridge in 1994
233 (9 tries, 103 goals), Graham Eadie in 1976
226 (7 tries, 99 goals), Graham Eadie in 1983
221 (13 tries, 91 goals), Ron Rowles in 1954
220 (12 tries, 92 goals), Ron Rowles in 1951
216 (10 tries, 93 goals), Graham Eadie in 1974

Most tries in a season
28, Tom Trbojevic in 2021
27, Phil Blake in 1983
26, Jason Saab in 2021
23, Kevin Junee in 1974
23, Reuben Garrick in 2021
22, Steve Menzies in 1995
22, Terry Hill in 1997
22, Brett Stewart in 2008
21, Bob Fulton in 1976
20, John Ribot in 1982
20, Steve Menzies in 1996
20, Steve Menzies in 1998
20, David Williams in 2013
20, Jorge Taufua in 2013

Most goals in a season
121, Reuben Garrick in 2021
106, Matthew Ridge in 1994
106, Matthew Ridge in 1995 
103, Graham Eadie in 1976 
100, Graham Eadie in 1975
99, Graham Eadie in 1983
93, Graham Eadie in 1974
92, Ron Rowles in 1951
91, Ron Rowles in 1954
89, Jamie Lyon in 2013

Most field goals in a season
19, Bob Fulton in 1970
14, Bob Fulton in 1968
14, Dennis Ward in 1968
11, Dennis Ward in 1970
10, Bob Fulton in 1967

Most points in a match
30 (4 tries, 9 goals), Ron Rowles vs. Canterbury-Bankstown on 24 July 1954 @ Brookvale Oval
30 (2 tries, 11 goals), Matthew Ridge vs. Western Suburbs on 25 August 1996 @ Brookvale Oval
30 (2 tries, 11 goals), Reuben Garrick vs. Canterbury-Bankstown on 3 July 2021 @ Bankwest Stadium
28 (14 goals), Graham Eadie vs. Penrith Panthers on 29 July 1973 @ Penrith Park
28 (3 tries, 8 goals), Matthew Ridge vs. Western Reds on 25 June 1995 @ Brookvale Oval
28 (3 tries, 8 goals), Matt Orford vs. Sydney Roosters on 7 July 2007 @ Brookvale Oval
28 (4 tries, 6 goals), Reuben Garrick vs. Gold Coast Titans on 20 June 2021 @ Cbus Super Stadium
28 (3 tries, 8 goals), Reuben Garrick vs. Parramatta Eels on 14 August 2021 @ Sunshine Coast Stadium

Most tries in a match
5, Les Hanigan vs. Cronulla-Sutherland Sharks on 14 May 1967 @ Brookvale Oval

Most goals in a match
14, Graham Eadie vs. Penrith Panthers on 29 July 1973 @ Penrith Park

Most Premierships as Captain
2 - Fred Jones – 1972, 1973
1 - Bob Fulton – 1976
1 - Max Krilich – 1978
1 - Paul Vautin – 1987
1 - Geoff Toovey – 1996
1 - Matt Orford – 2008
1 - Jamie Lyon – 2011

Premiership wins as a player
4 – Graham Eadie, Ian Martin, Terry Randall
3 – Bob Fulton, Ray Branighan
2 – Ken Irvine, Max Brown, Mal Reilly, John O'Neill, Fred Jones, Bill Hamilton, Tom Mooney, Russel Gartner, Alan Thompson, John Harvey, Max Krilich, Cliff Lyons, Des Hasler, Steve Menzies, Brett Stewart, Michael Robertson, Steve Matai, Jamie Lyon, Brent Kite, Matt Ballin, Anthony Watmough, Glenn Stewart
1 – Dennis Ward, Allan Thomson, John Mayes, Peter Peters, John Bucknall, Rod Jackson, Gary Stephens, Phil Lowe, Steve Norton, Gary Thoroughgood, Mark Willoughby, Stephen Knight, Simon Booth, Steve Martin, Bruce Walker, Ian Thomson, Wayne Springall, Dale Shearer, David Ronson, Darrell Williams, Michael O'Connor, Stuart Davis, Paul Vautin, Noel Cleal, Ron Gibbs, Kevin Ward, Mal Cochrane, Phil Daley, Paul Shaw, Mark Pocock, Matthew Ridge, Danny Moore, Craig Innes, Terry Hill, John Hopoate, Nik Kosef, Geoff Toovey, David Gillespie, Jim Serdaris, Mark Carroll, Daniel Gartner, Owen Cunningham, Neil Tierney, Craig Hancock, Steven Bell, David Williams, Matt Orford, Josh Perry, Glen Hall, Heath L'Estrange, Mark Bryant, Jason King, Will Hopoate*, Kieran Foran*, Daly Cherry-Evans, Joe Galuvao, Tony Williams, Shane Rodney, Jamie Buhrer, Vic Mauro, George Rose

* Still playing as of 2023 but no longer with Manly.

Most Grand Finals as a player
7 – Graham Eadie including 2 GF appearances in 1978
6 – Ian Martin, Terry Randall both played 2 GFs in 1978
5 – Bob Fulton, Steve Menzies, Alan Thompson- Alan Thompson played in 2 GFs in 1978
4 – Fred Jones, Bill Hamilton, Cliff Lyons, Brett Stewart, Steve Matai, Jamie Lyon, Brent Kite, Anthony Watmough, Glenn Stewart, Max Krilich (incl 2 x GFs in 1978)

Rothmans Medal winners
 Graham Eadie (1974)
 Mal Cochrane (1986)

Dally M Medal winners
 Matt Orford (2008)
 Tom Trbojevic (2021)

Coaching Records

Most Games Coached
 307, Bob Fulton (1983–1989, 1993–1999)
 303, Des Hasler (2004–2011, 2019–2022)
 139, Ron Willey (1962, 1970–1974)
 123, Frank Stanton (1975–1979)
 105, Geoff Toovey (2012–2015)
 101, Wally O'Connell (1950–1952, 1966–1967)
 98, Ken Arthurson (1957–1961)

Most Wins as a Coach
 205, Bob Fulton (1983–1989, 1993–1999)
 170, Des Hasler (2004–2011, 2019–2022)
 97, Ron Willey (1962, 1970–1974)
 77, Frank Stanton (1975–1979)
 61, Geoff Toovey (2012–2015)
 56, Ken Arthurson (1957–1961)

Most Losses as a Coach
 133, Des Hasler (2004-2011, 2019–2022)
 96, Bob Fulton (1983–1989, 1993–1999)
 45, Ron Willey (1962, 1970–1974)
 43, Frank Stanton (1975–1979)
 43, Geoff Toovey (2012–2015)
 40, Ken Arthurson (1957–1961)

Most Grand Finals Coached
 5, Bob Fulton (1983, 1987, 1995, 1996, 1997)
 3, Ron Willey (1970, 1972, 1973)
 3, Des Hasler (2007, 2008, 2011)
 2, Ken Arthurson (1957, 1959)
 2, Frank Stanton (1976, 1978)

Most Premierships as a Coach
 2, Ron Willey (1972, 1973)
 2, Frank Stanton (1976, 1978)
 2, Bob Fulton (1987, 1996)
 2, Des Hasler (2008, 2011)

Club Records
{| class="wikitable" width="75%" style="font-size:90%"
|- bgcolor="#efefef"
! colspan=11 |Manly Warringah Sea Eagles
|-
|Effective 16 March 2023
|-
|Biggest Win  66–0 vs. Canterbury-Bankstown Bulldogs (2021) @ Bankwest Stadium
|-
|Biggest Loss  6–68 vs. Cronulla-Sutherland Sharks (2005) @ Toyota Park
|-
|Consecutive Wins  15 – (1995)
|-
|Consecutive Losses  8 – (1950 / 1998–1999)
|-
|Best Winning Percentage (10+ Games)  Gold Coast Chargers – Played 17 / Won 14 (82.36%)
|-
|Worst Winning Percentage (10+ Games)  St. George Illawarra Dragons - Played 33 / Won 11 (33.34%)
|-
|Clubs (Most Wins Against)  Parramatta Eels – 88
|-
|Clubs (Most Losses To)  South Sydney Rabbitohs – 71
|-
|Brookvale Oval Record Attendance  27,655 vs. Parramatta Eels (1986)
|-
|Record Attendance  104,583 vs. Newcastle Knights (1999) @ Stadium Australia*
|-
|Grand Final Record Attendance  81,988 vs. New Zealand Warriors (2011) @ ANZ Stadium
|-
|Brookvale Oval Record  Played 699 – (W) 475 / (L) 210 / (D) 14
|-
|Home Win Rate  67.96%
|-
|NSWRL/ARL/NRL Record  Played 1,685 – (W) 955 / (L) 694 / (D) 36
|-
|NSWRL/ARL/NRL Finals Record <td align="left"> Played 99 – (W) 46 / (L) 51 / (D) 2
|-
|Overall Win Rate <td align="left"> 56.68%
|}
* NRL double-header also featured Parramatta vs. St. George Illawarra

Biggest Wins vs Current NRL Clubs

Biggest Losses vs Current NRL Clubs

Biggest Wins vs Former Clubs

Biggest Losses vs Former Clubs

Win % vs Current Clubs

Win % vs Former Clubs

Most Consecutive Wins
15, 12 March – 9 July 1995

Most Consecutive Losses
8, 6 May – 29 July 1950
8, 28 August 1998 – 18 April 1999

Biggest Comeback
Recovered from a 20-point deficit.
Trailed Penrith Panthers 26–6 after 53 minutes to win 36–26 at Brookvale Oval on 29 May 2005

Worst Collapse
Surrendered a 24-point lead.
Led St George Illawarra Dragons 34–10 after 57 minutes to lose 36–34 at Oki Jubilee Stadium on 29 August 2004

Highest Attendances vs Current NRL Clubs

* Grand Final

Highest Attendances vs Former Clubs

* Grand Final

Other Attendances

See also

List of NRL records

References

External links

Records
Sydney-sport-related lists
National Rugby League lists
Australian records
Rugby league records and statistics